Allan Holtz is a comic strip historian who researches and writes about newspaper comics for his Stripper's Guide blog, launched in 2005. His research encompasses some 7,000 American comic strips and newspaper panels. In addition to his contributions to Hogan's Alley and other publications about vintage comic strips, he is the author of American Newspaper Comics: An Encyclopedic Reference Guide (2012). He is a resident of Tavares, Florida.

Work
Holtz's blog Stripper's Guide posts such regular series as "News of Yore" (including news items from back issues of Editor & Publisher), "Obscurity of the Day" (little-known strips) and a series on George Herriman. One such obscurity discussed by Holtz is The Captain's Gig, a little-known strip by Virgil Partch; it ran as a daily and Sunday from 1977 to 1979. Other obscurities rediscovered by Holtz go back to the earliest published comic strips. He also surveys the history of comic strip syndicates, along with the detailed information he provides on writers and artists. In a 2002 issue of Hogan's Alley, Holtz wrote about his almost accidental discovery in a microfilmed archive of The Pittsburgh Leader of F. E. Johnson's Bobby the Boy Scout, which Holtz traced back to August 21, 1911, and regards as the very first serious adventure comic.

Maynard Frank Wolfe (Rube Goldberg Inventions) praised Holtz as "the extraordinary collector conservator computer wizard and historian of cartoon art."

Books
Holtz is also a contributor to NBM's Forever Nuts: Classic Screwball Strips series, writing biographical introductions for the volumes on Frederick Opper and Bud Fisher, and creating annotations for Bringing Up Father and other strips reprinted in this series.

His 600-page American Newspaper Comics: An Encyclopedic Reference Guide, previously available as a subscription CD service, was published by the University of Michigan Press in 2012. The book features over 7000 newspaper comics series with the following information: 
beginning and end dates
frequency and format
artist and writer beginning and ending dates and roles
syndicate information
alternate titles
book collections
story listings
source notes indicating where information was gathered
extensive introductory material describing the research methods used, and explanatory notes about the evolution of the newspaper comic strip
a directory of newspaper syndicates, with capsule histories of over 100 companies
cross-reference of syndicates, listing all features they distributed
cross-reference of creators, listing all features with which they were involved
cross-reference of alternate titles to listed features
a bundled CD with over 3000 high quality sample images of over 2000 different features covered in the book

See also
Nicholson Baker
Bill Blackbeard
Comic Art
Woody Gelman
List of newspaper comic strips
Dave Strickler
List of comic strip syndicates
The Sunday Funnies

References

External links
Allan Holtz review: Nicholson Baker's Double Fold
"Bringing Up Father: 1913–14 Annotations" by Allan Holtz
Comic Strip Barons trading card set by Allan Holtz

21st-century American historians
American bloggers
American art historians
Comics critics
Living people
People from Tavares, Florida
Year of birth missing (living people)
Historians from Florida